Koppers Building is a historical building in Pittsburgh, Pennsylvania, commissioned by Andrew W. Mellon and completed in 1929. The building is named after the Koppers Chemical Corporation and is one of the major features of Downtown Pittsburgh.

Overview
Koppers Building was completed in March 1929, and it has 34 floors at a cost of $5.3 million (equivalent to $ million in ). Its address is Grant Street & Seventh Avenue. It is the best example of Art Deco construction and ornamentation in Pittsburgh.

It is constructed with Indiana limestone with a polished granite base and dark copper roof. Inside the Koppers Building the lobby is richly decorated with marble walls. Its copper roof is pitched in a chateau-like design and is illuminated at night. The building was designed by the architectural firm of Graham, Anderson, Probst & White.

In February 1948, Equitable of New York purchased the building for $6 million (equivalent to $ million in ).

References

Further reading

External links

 
 Koppers Tower at Emporis

Art Deco architecture in Pennsylvania
Headquarters in the United States
Office buildings completed in 1929
Pittsburgh History & Landmarks Foundation Historic Landmarks
Skyscraper office buildings in Pittsburgh